Dark Shadows is a 2012 dark fantasy film based on the gothic television soap opera of the same name. Directed by Tim Burton, the film stars Johnny Depp, Michelle Pfeiffer, Helena Bonham Carter, Eva Green, Jackie Earle Haley, Jonny Lee Miller, Chloë Grace Moretz, and Bella Heathcote in a dual role. Christopher Lee has a small role in the film, his 200th film appearance and his fifth and final appearance in a Burton film. Jonathan Frid, star of the original Dark Shadows series, makes a cameo, which was his final screen appearance, as he died shortly before the release of the film. One of the film's producers, Richard D. Zanuck, died two months after its release.

The film had a limited release on May 10, 2012, and was officially released the following day in North America. It performed poorly at the United States box office, but did well in foreign markets. Reviews for the film were mixed; critics praised its visual style and consistent humor, but felt it lacked a focused or substantial plot and developed characters.

Plot
In 1760, young Barnabas Collins and his wealthy family set sail from Liverpool to the New World, where they establish the town of Collinsport in Maine and construct Collinwood Mansion, their grand estate. Fifteen years later, Barnabas spurns the advances of his servant, Angelique, who is secretly a witch. In response, she murders his parents using magic and curses Barnabas so that "all he loves will die".

Barnabas becomes obsessed with dark magic to prove his parents were murdered. Under Angelique's spell, his fiancée Josette jumps to her death from a cliff called "Widow's Hill". He throws himself after her, but survives, further cursed by Angelique to eternal suffering as a vampire. Angelique turns the town against Barnabas and gets him buried alive.

In 1972, almost 200-years-later, Maggie Evans, who bears an uncanny resemblance to Josette, travels to Collinwood to fill the position of governess. She assumes the alias Victoria Winters and meets the dysfunctional current-residents of Collinwood: Collins matriarch Elizabeth and her teenage daughter Carolyn; Elizabeth's brother Roger and his young son David, who believes he is being visited by his late-mother's ghost; and a live-in alcoholic psychiatrist, Dr. Julia Hoffman. That night, Victoria is visited by the ghost of Josette.

A construction crew building a McDonald's unwittingly frees Barnabas from his tomb. He apologetically feeds on their blood and then makes his way to Collinwood, perplexed by the modern-day technology and fashion he encounters.

At Collinwood, Barnabas hypnotizes the caretaker, Willie, into his service and reveals to Elizabeth that the legends of the family curse and her long-lost ancestor are true. He asks to rejoin the family and shows Elizabeth the manor's secret passages and hidden treasure. Though wary, she introduces him to the family as a distant relative from England.

While adjusting to modern life and falling for Victoria, Barnabas uses his powers of persuasion and the family treasure to restore both the Collins Canning Company and Collinwood to their former glory. Dr. Hoffman learns of his true nature and offers to try to turn him mortal again. They start by removing his blood and giving him transfusions of human blood.

Angelique, having survived through the centuries and now the owner of the dominant Angel Bay Seafood, is still in love with Barnabas. To protect Victoria, he gives in to Angelique's lust and they have sex in her office, but, afterwards, a remorseful Barnabas again rejects Angelique.

Barnabas hosts a "happening" at Collinwood for the entire town, with Alice Cooper as entertainment. He finds Victoria alone, who reveals she has seen the ghost of Josette her entire life; her parents committed her to an asylum as a result, but she eventually escaped and Josette directed her to Collinwood. She returns Barnabas' affections and they kiss, to Angelique's dismay.

More eager than ever to be human, Barnabas goes to Dr. Hoffman's office, where he discovers her transfusing his blood into herself to try to stop her aging. He drains all the blood from her body, and he and Willie dump her at sea, telling everyone she went away on business.

Barnabas confronts the greedy Roger and offers him a choice: to become a better father to David, or to leave Collinwood with enough money to live out his life elsewhere; Roger chooses the latter. Heartbroken, David is nearly struck by a falling disco ball, but Barnabas saves him with supernatural speed and catches fire in the daylight, revealing himself as a vampire. David, Carolyn, and Victoria are shocked.

Desperate, Barnabas meets with Angelique, who goads him into confessing to his murders and demands he join her as her paramour. He refuses, so she again traps him in a coffin. Angelique destroys the Collins' cannery and, with a recording of Barnabas' confession, rallies the town against the family.

David frees Barnabas, who confronts Angelique at Collinwood. They battle, and the townspeople see that she is a witch. Elizabeth and Carolyn, who reveals herself to be a werewolf, join the fight, and Angelique enchants the house to turn against the Collins family. She admits she was responsible for the werewolf that bit Carolyn as an infant, and for the deaths of David's mother and Barnabas' parents. The ghost of David's mother appears and incapacitates Angelique, and the family escape the burning manor. Angelique offers Barnabas her heart, which crumbles as she dies.

Barnabas races to Widow's Hill and finds Victoria, who says there is only one way for them to be together. When he refuses to turn her into a vampire, she steps off the cliff. He leaps after her, biting her neck on the way down. On the rocks, he holds her in his arms. Now a vampire, she awakens as Josette. As they kiss, a voiceover from Barnabas declares that his curse is now lifted.

Though Barnabas thinks he is finally safe, Dr. Hoffman, bound and on the sea floor, opens her eyes.

Cast
 Johnny Depp as Barnabas Collins, an 18th-century vampire who awakens in 1972.
 Justin Tracy as Young Barnabas
 Eva Green as Angelique "Angie" Bouchard, a vengeful witch who plots a vendetta against Barnabas and his family. She is still alive in the 20th century, having posed as five successive generations of women who own a seafood business called Angel Bay, which has outcompeted the Collins family business. Her face and body begin to crack over the course of the film, resembling a porcelain doll.
 Raffey Cassidy as Young Angelique
 Bella Heathcote as Victoria Winters / Josette du Pres. Heathcote plays both Josette, Barnabas' 18th-century love, and Victoria, David's governess and Barnabas' 20th-century love-interest. In the end of the film she becomes Josette and a vampiress when Barnabas followed & bit her on the neck when she fell off the cliff. Victoria and Maggie Evans' roles from the original series were combined for the film, and, in her first scene in the movie, Maggie adopts the alias of "Victoria Winters", inspired by a poster on the train to Collinsport advertising winter sports in Victoria, British Columbia.
 Alexia Osborne as Young Victoria 
 Michelle Pfeiffer as Elizabeth Collins Stoddard, the family matriarch.
Helena Bonham Carter as Dr. Julia Hoffman, the family's vain and often inebriated live-in psychiatrist, who was hired to treat David's trauma over his mother's death.
 Jonny Lee Miller as Roger Collins, Elizabeth's ne'er-do-well brother.
 Chloë Grace Moretz as Carolyn Stoddard, Elizabeth's rebellious 15-year-old daughter, who is revealed to be a werewolfess late in the film.
 Gully McGrath as David Collins, Roger's precocious 10-year-old son, who is regularly visited by the ghost of his dead mother.
 Jackie Earle Haley as Willie Loomis, caretaker of Collinwood Mansion.
 Ray Shirley as Mrs. Sarah Johnson, Collinwood's elderly maid.
 Christopher Lee as Silas Clarney, a "king of the fishermen who spends a lot of time in the local pub, The Blue Whale."
 Alice Cooper as himself
 Ivan Kaye as Joshua Collins, the father of Barnabas Collins.
 Susanna Cappellaro as Naomi Collins, the mother of Barnabas Collins.
 Josephine Butler as Laura Collins, David's mother, whose ghost has been appearing to her son since she drowned in a shipwreck caused by Angelique.
 William Hope as Sheriff Bill (credited as Sheriff), the sheriff of Collinsport.
 Guy Flanagan as Bearded Hippie
 Sophie Kennedy Clark as Hippie Chick 1
 Hannah Murray as Hippie Chick 2
 Shane Rimmer as Board Member 1
 Jonathan Frid as Guest #1

At the San Diego Comic-Con 2011, it was confirmed that four actors from the original series would appear in the film. In June 2011, Jonathan Frid, Lara Parker, David Selby, and Kathryn Leigh Scott all spent three days at Pinewood Studios to film cameo appearances. They all appeared as guests during the ball held at Collinwood Manor and can be seen arriving as a group. Frid died in April 2012, making this his final film appearance.

Production
In July 2007, Warner Bros. acquired film rights for the gothic soap opera Dark Shadows from the estate of its creator, Dan Curtis. Johnny Depp had a childhood obsession with Dark Shadows, calling it a "dream" to portray Barnabas Collins, and ended up persuading Tim Burton to direct. The project's development was delayed by the 2007–2008 Writers Guild of America strike. After the strike was resolved, Burton was attached to direct the film.

By 2009, screenwriter John August was writing a screenplay for Dark Shadows. In 2010, author and screenwriter Seth Grahame-Smith replaced August, but, on the finished film, August did receive story credit with Smith for his contributions to the film.

Filming began in May 2011. Production took place entirely in England, at both Pinewood Studios and on location. Depp attempted to emulate the "rigidity" and "elegance" of Jonathan Frid's original portrayal, but also drew inspiration from Max Schreck's performance in Nosferatu.

A number of Burton's frequent collaborators worked on the film's crew, among them production designer Rick Heinrichs, costume designer Colleen Atwood, editor Chris Lebenzon, and composer Danny Elfman. French cinematographer Bruno Delbonnel—known for his work in Amélie, A Very Long Engagement and Harry Potter and the Half-Blood Prince—also worked on the project.

Music

Score
The film was scored by long-time Burton collaborator Danny Elfman. An album featuring 21 tracks of compositions from the film by Elfman was released on May 8, 2012.

Track listing

Soundtrack

A number of contemporaneous early-1970s rock and pop songs appear in the film, along with others from earlier and slightly later. These include "Nights in White Satin" by The Moody Blues, "I'm Sick of You" by Iggy Pop, "Season of the Witch" by Donovan, "Top of the World" by The Carpenters, "You're the First, the Last, My Everything" by Barry White and "Get It On" by T. Rex. Alice Cooper makes a cameo in the film and sings "No More Mr. Nice Guy" and "Ballad of Dwight Fry". A cover of the Raspberries' song "Go All the Way" by The Killers plays over the end credits.

Dark Shadows: Original Motion Picture Soundtrack was released on May 8, 2012, as a download and on various dates as a CD, such as on May 22 as an import in the United States and on May 25 in Australia. It features 11 songs, among them two score pieces by Danny Elfman and a recitation by Depp as Barnabas of several lines from "The Joker" by Steve Miller Band. Songs not featured on the soundtrack that are in the film include "Superfly" by Curtis Mayfield, "Crocodile Rock" by Elton John and "Paranoid" by Black Sabbath.

Track listing
Included next to each track is the year of the song's original release, excluding the score pieces.

Reception

Box office
The film grossed $79.7 million in the United States and Canada, and $165.8 million in other territories, for a worldwide total of $245.5 million.

For a Burton film, Dark Shadows achieved below-average domestic box office takings, with many commentators attributing that to the domination of The Avengers. It made $29.7 million in its first weekend, then $12.8 million in its second.

Critical response
On Rotten Tomatoes, Dark Shadows holds an approval rating of 35% based on 259 reviews, with an average rating of 5.30/10; the site's critical consensus reads: "The visuals are top notch but Tim Burton never finds a consistent rhythm, mixing campy jokes and gothic spookiness with less success than other Johnny Depp collaborations." On Metacritic, the film has a weighted average score of 55 out of 100, based on 42 critics, indicating "mixed or average reviews". Audiences polled by CinemaScore gave the film an average grade of "B−" on an A+ to F scale.

Some critics felt the film lacked a focused or consistent plot or genre (as either horror, comedy or drama), pointing to problems with Grahame-Smith's script, and that some jokes fell flat. Some claimed that Burton and Depp's collaborations had become tired. Many of these same critics, however, noted that this film's visual style was impressive.

Positive reviewers, on the other hand, opined that the film successfully translated the mood of the soap opera and that its '70s culture pastiche worked to its advantage. There was also acclaim for the characters and actors, most notably Depp as Barnabas—who several critics said was the stand-out character due to his humorous culture shock—and Pfeiffer.

Roger Ebert gave the film two-and-a-half stars out of four and said: "[The film] offers wonderful things, but they aren't what's important. It's as if Burton directed at arm's length, unwilling to find juice in the story." He went on to note that "Much of the amusement comes from Depp's reactions to 1970s pop culture," and concluded that the film "begins with great promise, but then the energy drains out". Manohla Dargis, in a mostly-positive review written for The New York Times, said that the film "isn't among Mr. Burton's most richly realized works, but it's very enjoyable, visually sumptuous and, despite its lugubrious source material and a sporadic tremor of violence, surprisingly effervescent," and opined that Burton's "gift for deviant beauty and laughter has its own liberating power."

Rolling Stones Peter Travers gave the film a mixed two-and-a-half stars out of four, claiming that "After a fierce and funny start, Dark Shadows simply spins its wheels," and adding that "the pleasures of Dark Shadows are frustratingly hit-and-miss. In the end, it all collapses into a spectacularly gorgeous heap." In The Washington Post, Ann Hornaday dismissed the film, awarding it just one-and-a-half stars out of four and explaining that "Burton's mash-up of post-'60s kitsch and modern-day knowingness strikes a chord that is less self-aware than fatally self-satisfied. Dark Shadows doesn't know where it wants to dwell: in the eerie, subversive penumbra suggested by its title or in playful, go-for-broke camp."

Richard Corliss of Time pointed out that "[Burton]'s affection is evident, and his homage sometimes acute," and reasoned: "All right, so Burton has made less a revival of the old show than a hit-or-miss parody pageant," but praised the star power of the film, relenting that "attention must be paid to movie allure, in a star like Depp and his current harem. Angelique may be the only demonic among the women here, but they're all bewitching." Peter Bradshaw, in the British newspaper The Guardian, weighed the film in a mixed write-up, giving it three stars out of five, and pointing out his feeling that "the Gothy, jokey 'darkness' of Burton's style is now beginning to look very familiar; he has built his brand to perfection in the film marketplace, and it is smarter and more distinctive than a lot of what is on offer at the multiplex, but there are no surprises. There are shadows, but they conceal nothing."

Accolades

Home media

Dark Shadows was released on both Blu-ray and DVD in the United States on October 2, 2012 (the date confirmed by the official Dark Shadows Facebook page and the official Dark Shadows website). It was released on both formats several days earlier in Australia; in stores on September 24, and online on September 26. The film was released on home video in the UK on October 15.

The DVD includes just one featurette, "The Collinses: Every Family Has Its Demons", while the Blu-ray contains a total of nine short featurettes and six deleted scenes. Several worldwide releases of both the DVD and Blu-ray contain an UltraViolet digital copy of the film.

Possible sequel
In December 2011, Pfeiffer told MTV that she was hoping there would be sequels to the film. On May 8, 2012, various tabloids, like Variety, reported that Warner Bros. may have wanted to turn Dark Shadows into a film franchise. On the same day, Collider mentioned that the ending lends itself to a possible sequel. When Burton was asked if he thought this could be a possible start to a franchise, he replied: "No. Because of the nature of it being like a soap opera, that was the structure. It wasn't a conscious decision. First of all, it's a bit presumptuous to think that. If something works out, that's one thing, but you can't ever predict that. [The ending] had more to do with the soap opera structure of it."

See also
 Vampire film
There have been two other feature films based on the soap opera Dark Shadows:
 House of Dark Shadows (1970)
 Night of Dark Shadows (1971)

References

External links

 
 
 
 
 
 

2012 films
2012 comedy horror films
2012 fantasy films
2010s American films
2010s Australian films
2010s English-language films
2010s fantasy comedy films
2010s ghost films
2010s supernatural horror films
American comedy horror films
American dark fantasy films
American ghost films
American fantasy comedy films
American supernatural horror films
American vampire films
American werewolf films
Australian comedy horror films
Australian ghost films
Australian fantasy comedy films
Australian supernatural horror films
Balls (dance party) in films
Films about curses
Films about witchcraft
Films based on television series
Films directed by Tim Burton
Films about hypnosis
Films produced by Graham King
Films produced by Johnny Depp
Films produced by Richard D. Zanuck
Films scored by Danny Elfman
Films set in 1760
Films set in 1972
Films set in country houses
Films set in Maine
Films set in the Thirteen Colonies
Films shot in England
Films shot at Pinewood Studios
GK Films films
Gothic horror films
IMAX films
Infinitum Nihil films
Vampire comedy films
Village Roadshow Pictures films
Warner Bros. films
The Zanuck Company films